Surbhi Jyoti (born 29 May 1988), is an Indian actress who appears in Hindi television along with Punjabi films. She made her acting debut with Akiyaan To Door Jayen Na as Sona in 2010. She rose to fame after her portrayal of Zoya Farooqui in Zee TV's romantic Qubool Hai for which she won numerous awards including 
ITA Awards for GR8! Performer Of The Year (Female).

Jyoti got wider attention after portraying shape-shifting serpent Bela Sehgal in Colors TV's popular supernatural Naagin 3 for which she received a nomination for Best Actress in Indian Television Academy Awards. In 2021, she made her Hindi film debut with Ssaurabh Tyagi's comedy-drama Kya Meri Sonam Gupta Bewafa Hai? opposite Jassie Gill.

Early life
Jyoti was born in Jalandhar, Punjab, India. She received her early education from Shiv Jyoti Public School and then graduated from Hans Raj Mahila Maha Vidyalaya. As a student of Hans Raj Mahila Maha Vidyalaya, she participated in debates and received honours. Surbhi is a graduate with a degree in Economics and a Master's degree in English Literature from Apeejay College of Fine Arts.

Career
Jyoti started her career in regional theatre and films. She has also been a radio jockey. She worked in Punjabi language films Ik Kudi Punjab Di, Raula Pai Gaya and Munde Patiala De as well as the Punjabi television series Akiyaan To Door Jayen Na and Kach Diyan Wanga.

In the end of 2012, Jyoti got the television show Qubool Hai which was produced by 4 Lions Films and was telecasted on Zee TV. She played the role of Zoya Farooqui. For the portrayal of the character, she won the award for GR8! Performer of the Year—Female at the Indian Television Academy Awards and Best Début Actress at the Zee Gold Awards 2013. She also won Best Jodi award with Karan Singh Grover. In 2014, Qubool Hai underwent a reboot, in which she played a double role of Sanam and Seher. In 2014, she ranked 16th in an annual poll conducted by UK-based weekly newspaper Eastern Eye.

In 2015, she also hosted three seasons of the love drama Pyaar Tune Kya Kiya opposite Meiyang Chang. At Zee Gold Awards 2015, Karanvir Bohra and Jyoti were given the Best Onscreen Jodi Award. In 2015, Qubool Hai introduced a 25-year leap, post which she played Mahira, her fifth role in the show. In 2015, she ranked 17th in an annual poll conducted by UK-based weekly newspaper Eastern Eye. The Show Qubool Hai ended in January 2016. In 2016, she hosted a travel based web show Desi Explorers Taiwan along with many other television actors. In 2016 she entered in 4 Lions Films' show Ishqbaaaz in a cameo opposite Shaleen Malhotra as Mallika Kabeer Choudhary, a business women who is an architect by profession. In September 2016, she hosted yet another travel based web show Desi Explorers Yas Island with many other television actors.

In 2017, she featured in 4 Lions Films' web show named Tanhaiyan opposite Barun Sobti as Meera Kapoor, a non judgmental and an emotionally vulnerable fashion designer. All episodes of the web series were released on Hotstar on 14 February 2017. In 2017, She starred in Star Plus's psychological thriller show Koi Laut Ke Aaya Hai as Geetanjali Singh Shekhari, a girl from a royal family. She was paired opposite Shoaib Ibrahim and the show included actors like Sharad Kelkar, Sreejita De and Shaleen Malhotra. The show ended on 18 June 2017.

In June 2018, Jyoti portrayed Bela Sehgal in Balaji Telefilms show Naagin 3 as the main female lead which aired on Colors TV. The show received high TRP's and ended in May 2019. In 2020 she appeared in Yeh Jaadu Hai Jinn Ka.

In 2020, Jyoti featured in a Music Video named "Aaj Bhi" opposite Actor Ali Fazal with VYRL Originals. In 2020, she also featured in another Music Video named "Judaiyaan" opposite Darshan Raval

In March 2021, She made her comeback in the digital space with the web series Qubool Hai 2.0, which is a reboot version of her popular Zee TV show Qubool Hai alongside actor Karan Singh Grover which marked their second collaboration after 8 years reprising their roles as Zoya and Asad respectively.

As of 2021 Surbhi Jyoti would be making her Big Screen Debut in Bollywood with Jassie Gill in "Kya Meri Sonam Gupta Bewafa Hai?"

Filmography

Films

Television

Special appearances

Web series

Music videos

Accolades

See also 
 List of Hindi television actresses
 List of Indian television actresses

References

External links

Living people
1988 births
People from Jalandhar
Actresses from Punjab, India
Indian film actresses
Indian television actresses
Indian soap opera actresses
Actresses in Punjabi cinema
Actresses in Hindi cinema
Actresses in Hindi television
Punjabi women
Indian television presenters
Indian women television presenters
21st-century Indian actresses